Paramphistomidae is a family of trematodes in the order Plagiorchiida.

Classification 
This family contains two subfamilies consisting of 17 genera.

 Paramphistominae
Calicophoron
 Cotylophoron
 Explanatum
 Gigantocotyle
 Paramphistomum
 Ugandocotyle
 Orthocoeliinae
Bilatorchis
 Buxifrons
 Gigantoatrium
 Glyptamphistoma
 Leiperocotyle
Nilocotyle
Orthocoelium
Platyamphistoma
Sellsitrema

 Genus of unknown rank
 Macropharynx

References

Plagiorchiida
Trematode families